Georgi Ivanov Naydenov (born July 19, 1927 – October 3, 1998) was a Bulgarian businessman and banker who was born in the small town of Strelcha, and became famous during the 1960s as the creator of the unique and successful economic experiment Texim.

The Economic Group 
The idea of Texim as an independent organization within the Bulgarian socialist economy originated with a starting capital of 10,000 Leva (1 Dollar at that time was equal to around 1.17 Leva).  Yet, although Texim existed for only 8 years from 1962 to 1969, its legendary success has accompanied the name until this day. Eventually, the experiment expanded to comprise three main units: Texim, the Imextracom Establishment, and the Bulgarian Trading Fleet. The Bulgarian Merchant Fleet included trade, shipbuilding, and docks, while Texim included the first Coca-Cola establishments in the entire communist bloc.

After the fall of communism, Naydenov created, the now oldest private bank in Bulgaria, Teximbank, in September 1992, which exists to this day.

Sources 

Official Website of Teximbank: http://www.teximbank.bg
The Texim Affair, Dobromir Zadgorski, Sofia: 1994
https://web.archive.org/web/20070929100501/http://www.mybulgaria.info/bulgaria/travel/information-about-bulgaria-38.html
http://www.kampanyarchivum.hu/files/300/8/3/7-2-27.html
http://www.hrw.org/reports/1999/bulgaria/Bulga994-02.htm#P384_79881
http://www.standartnews.com/archive/2001/07/22/english/interview/index.htm
https://web.archive.org/web/20090203043041/http://duma.bg/2007/1007/031007/iskam/isk-1.html
http://www.bgbook.dir.bg/book.php?ID=7290

1927 births
1998 deaths
20th-century Bulgarian businesspeople
People from Strelcha